The 2010 Campeonato Ecuatoriano de Fútbol de la Serie A (known as the 2010 Copa Credife Serie A for sponsorship reasons) was the 52nd season of the Serie A, Ecuador's premier football league. It ran from February 7 to December 12.

Emelec and LDU Quito each won the First and Second Stage, respectively, and played each other in the championship finals. LDU Quito won the first leg at home by a score of 2–0. Emelec could not overturn the deficit with a 1–0 win at home in the second leg. LDU Quito won their tenth national title, tying them for third overall with Emelec.

Format
A new format for the 2010 season was announced by the Ecuadorian Football Federation on December 15, 2009. The season was divided into three stages. The First and Second Stages were identical stages with a double round-robin format. Each team played the others twice, once at home and once away. The winners of each stage qualified to play a two-legged tie in the Third Stage for the title. The two highest non-stage winners in the aggregate table of the First and Second Stages played each in another two-legged tie in a Third Stage playoff for third place. Had the same team won both stages, they would have been automatically be crowned the champion. In that case, a two-legged tie would have been held in the Third Stage between the two best-placed teams in the aggregate table to determine who is the runner-up and who finished in third place. The two teams at the bottom of the aggregate table of the first two stages were relegated to the Serie B for the following season.

International qualification
The two stage winners earned a berth to the 2011 Copa Libertadores. The berth Ecuador 1 went to the champion, Ecuador 2 went to the runner-up, and Ecuador 3 went to the third-place finisher. Teams also qualified to two Copa Sudamericanas. The top-three teams in the First Stage qualified to the 2010 Copa Sudamericana (except LDU Quito, who had a berth as the defending Copa Sudamericana champion). The winner of the Second Stage earned the Ecuador 1 berth for the 2011 Copa Sudamericana.

Teams

Twelve teams competed in the 2010 Serie A season, ten of whom remained from the 2009 season. LDU Portoviejo and Técnico Universitario were relegated last season to the Serie B after accumulating the fewest points in the First and Second Stage aggregate table. They were replaced by Independiente José Terán and Universidad Católica, the 2009 Serie B winner and runner-up, respectively. This was Universidad Católica's 27th season in the Serie A, having last played in the league in 2008. This was Independiente José Terán's first season in the Serie A.

One team used a different stadium this season. ESPOLI chose to move from Estadio La Cocha in Latacunga to Estadio Olímpico Municipal Etho Vega in Santo Domingo de Los Colorados.

Managerial changes

IM: Interim manager(s).

First stage
The first stage began on February 7 and ended on July 4. Emelec won the stage and qualified to the championship playoff.

Standings

Results

Second stage
The second stage began July 9 and ended on November 27. LDU Quito won the stage and qualified to the championship playoff.

Standings

Results

Aggregate table

Third stage
The Third Stage began on December 4 and ended on December 12. Both ties in the Third Stage were determined by points. If there was a tie in points, the tie-breakers to be used in order were goal difference, away goals, and a penalty shoot-out.

Third-place playoff
Deportivo Quito and Barcelona qualified to the Third-place Playoff by being the two best non-stage winners in the aggregate table. The winner of the playoff earned the Ecuador 3 berth in the 2011 Copa Libertadores. By having the greater number of points in the aggregate table, Barcelona played the second leg as the home team.

Finals
Emelec and LDU Quito qualified to the Finals by being the First Stage and Second Stage winners, respectively. The winner was the Serie A champion and earned the Ecuador 1 berth in the 2011 Copa Libertadores. By having the greater number of points in the aggregate table, Emelec played the second leg as the home team.

Top goalscorers

Source:

Statistics
Longest winning streak: 7 games — Emelec (May 30–June 27)
Longest unbeaten streak: 15 games — LDU Quito (February 7–June 2; June 19–September 25)
Longest losing streak: 6 games — Barcelona (September 18–October 20)
Largest home win: LDU Quito 5–0 Emelec (February 28); El Nacional 5–0 Emelec (April 20); LDU Quito 5–0 Olmedo (June 20); Deportivo Quito 5–0 Universidad Católica (November 20)
Largest away win: ESPOLI 0–4 Independiente José Terán (April 20); Independiente José Terán 0–4 LDU Quito (October 29)
Highest scoring game: ESPOLI 5–3 El Nacional (February 27)

Awards
The awards were selected by the Asociación Ecuatoriana de Radiodifusión.
Best player: Jaime Ayoví (Emelec)
Best goalkeeper: José Francisco Cevallos (LDU Quito)
Best defender: Marcelo Fleitas (Emelec)
Best midfielder: David Quiroz (Emelec)
Best striker: Hernán Barcos (LDU Quito)
Best young player: Dennys Quiñónez (Barcelona)
Best manager: Edgardo Bauza (LDU Quito)
Best Ecuadorian playing abroad: Christian Benítez (Santos Laguna)
Best referee: Carlos Vera

References

External links
Official website 

Ecuadorian Serie A seasons
Ecu
Serie A